ROI_PAC is a software package created by the Jet Propulsion Laboratory division of NASA and Caltech for processing SAR images to create InSAR images, named interferograms. ROI_PAC stands for Repeat Orbit Interferometry PACkage. It is a UNIX based software package. 

Although many sources exist discussing how to install and use the basic features of the program, there was never a complete user manual created on how to use the software.

See also
 Interferometry

External links
The Open Channel Foundation download
Sean Buckley's thesis on algorithms used
University of California, Berkeley guide
Cornell University guide
Georgia Institute of Technology guide
Caltech/JPL ROI_pac Wiki

Physical geography
Synthetic aperture radar